The Supreme Court of the United States is the highest ranking judicial body in the United States. Established by Article III of the Constitution, the detailed structure of the court was laid down by the 1st United States Congress in 1789. Congress specified the Court's original and appellate jurisdiction, created 13 judicial districts, and fixed the initial size of the Supreme Court. The number of justices on the Supreme Court was changed six times before settling at the present total of nine in 1869. A total of 115 persons have served on the Supreme Court since 1789. Justices have life tenure, and so they serve until they die in office, resign or retire, or are impeached and removed from office.

The graphical timeline below lists the justices of the Supreme Court of the United States by court composition. As Supreme Court historians categorize eras in the court's history by the name of the presiding chief justice, the timeline is divided into sections, according to who was chief justice at the time. The incumbent associate justices at the start of each court era are listed in order of their seniority at that time. Justices joining the court during an era are listed below them in the order of their appointment. The bars are color-coded to show the changes in seniority among the justices during each era.

List of justices

Jay Court

The Jay Court era, under the leadership of John Jay, lasted from February 2, 1790, when the court held its inaugural session, to June 29, 1795. The Judiciary Act of 1789 set the number of Supreme Court justices at six: one chief justice and five associate justices. Eight justices served during this court.

Rutledge Court

The Rutledge Court era, under the leadership of John Rutledge, lasted from August 12, 1795, when Rutledge received a recess appointment from President Washington to serve as chief justice, through  1795, following the U.S. Senate's rejection of his nomination to a lifetime appointment to the chief justice position. Rutledge had previously served on the Court from 1790 to 1791 as an associate justice. Six justices served during this court.

Ellsworth Court

The Ellsworth Court era, under the leadership of Oliver Ellsworth, lasted from March 8, 1796 to December 15, 1800. Eight justices served during this court.

Marshall Court

The Marshall Court era lasted from February 4, 1801 to July 6, 1835. In 1807, Congress passed the Seventh Circuit Act, which added a sixth associate justice to the Supreme Court. 16 justices served during this court.

Taney Court

The Taney Court era, under the leadership of Roger Taney, lasted from March 28, 1836 to October 12, 1864. Two associate justice seats were added to the court in 1837, as a result of the Eighth and Ninth Circuits Act; another one was added in 1863, by the Tenth Circuit Act, enlarging the court to 10 justices. 20 justices served during this court.

Chase Court

The Chase Court era, under the leadership of Salmon P. Chase. lasted from December 15, 1864 to May 7, 1873. Two associate justice seats were abolished as a result of the Judicial Circuits Act of 1866, which provided for the gradual elimination of seats on the court until there would be seven justices. The size of the court was later restored to nine members through the Judiciary Act of 1869. 13 justices served during this court.

Waite Court

The Waite Court era, under the leadership of Morrison Waite, lasted from March 4, 1874 to March 23, 1888. 15 justices served during this court.

Fuller Court

The Fuller Court era, under the leadership of Melville Fuller, lasted from October 10, 1888 to July 4, 1910. 20 justices served during this court.

White Court

The White Court era, under the leadership of Edward Douglass White, lasted from December 19, 1910 to May 19, 1921.

Taft Court

The Taft Court era, under the leadership of William Howard Taft, lasted from July 11, 1921 to February 3, 1930. Taft was also the nation's 27th president (1909–13); he is the only person to serve as both President of the United States and Chief Justice. 13 justices served during this court.

Hughes Court

The Hughes Court era, under the leadership of Charles Evans Hughes, lasted from February 24, 1930 to June 30, 1941. Hughes had previously served on the Court from 1910 to 1916 as an associate justice. 16 justices served during this court.

Stone Court

The Stone Court era, under the leadership of Harlan F. Stone, lasted from July 3, 1941 to April 22, 1946.

Vinson Court

The Vinson Court era, under the leadership of Fred M. Vinson, lasted from June 24, 1946 to September 8, 1953. 11 justices served during this court.

Warren Court

The Warren Court era, under the leadership of Earl Warren, lasted from October 5, 1953, after Warren received a recess appointment from President Eisenhower to serve as chief justice, to June 23, 1969. 17 justices served during this court.

Burger Court

The Burger Court era, under the leadership of Warren E. Burger, lasted from June 23, 1969 to September 26, 1986. 13 justices, including the retired Sandra Day O'Connor, served during this court.

Rehnquist Court

The Rehnquist Court era, under the leadership of William Rehnquist, lasted from September 26, 1986 to September 3, 2005.

Roberts Court

The Roberts Court era, under the leadership of John Roberts, began September 29, 2005 and is ongoing. 16 justices have served during this court.

See also
 History of the Supreme Court of the United States
 Timeline of justices, graphical timeline depicting the progression of the justices (justices to justice succession) on the Supreme Court

External links
Decisions and biography by Justice – Legal Information Institute, Cornell Law School, Ithaca, New York 
History of the Court – The Supreme Court Historical Society, Washington, D.C.

References

court composition
US Supreme Court